Kader Sevinc is the European Union representative of CHP, Turkey's social democratic party. She is also a presidency member of the Party of European Socialists (PES), a transatlantic fellow at Johns Hopkins University's School of Advanced International Studies (SAIS) in Washington DC, a published poet, and a social entrepreneur.

Her personal initiatives include the Brussels-based debate club, the Turkish Coffee Briefings, “Smart Democracy & Smart Citizenship” workshops, and other related projects. She is also a member of Passa Porta, a poetry collective in Brussels.

References

External links

 CHP's official website
 CHP's EU website
 Party of European Socialists website
 Sevinc's website

Living people
Turkish politicians
Turkish writers
Year of birth missing (living people)